John Deedes (14 June 1803 – 11 January 1885) was an amateur English first-class cricketer.

Deedes was educated at Winchester and Trinity College, Cambridge. He made his first-class debut for Cambridge University in 1822, playing a single match for the club against the Cambridge Town Club. During the same season, Deedes made his first-class debut for Kent against the Marylebone Cricket Club.

Deedes next first-class appearance came in 1827 for the Gentlemen in the Gentlemen v Players player fixture, in which Deedes appeared in both the Gentlemen v Players fixtures for 1827, as well as representing Kent in a single first-class match against the Marylebone Cricket Club.

In 1828 Deedes made his only first-class appearance for Hampshire against an early England team. Deedes also made two further appearances for Kent in 1828, with his final first-class appearance for the county coming against Sussex.

In 1829 Deedes played in the unusually named first-class fixture Married v Single, where Deedes represented the Single team, suggesting at this time Deedes was not married or had no partner of sorts. Deedes played a final fixture for the Gentlemen in the 1829 Gentlemen v Players and made a single first-class appearance for England against Surrey.

Deedes died at Belgravia, Westminster on 11 January 1885.

Family
Deedes brother William Deedes, Sr. played first-class cricket for Hampshire, Kent and the Marylebone Cricket Club. As well as playing first-class cricket, William was a Conservative Party politician who was a Member of Parliament for East Kent from 1845 to 1857 and 1857–1862 following the resignation from the House of Commons of Sir Edward Dering who had defeated Deedes at the 1857 election.

Deedes nephew William Deedes, Jr. also played first-class cricket and was later also an MP for East Kent.

References

External links

1803 births
1885 deaths
People from Folkestone and Hythe District
People from Kent
English cricketers
Cambridge University cricketers
Gentlemen cricketers
Kent cricketers
Hampshire cricketers
Alumni of Trinity College, Cambridge
English cricketers of 1787 to 1825
Married v Single cricketers